Syed Zafar Islam is a Member of Parliament in the  Rajya Sabha from Uttar Pradesh which is inside India Union. He is the national spokesperson of the Bharatiya Janata Party. Islam is a former investment banker and the former Managing director at Deutsche Bank. He is regarded as one of the prominent Muslim leaders of the party.

He was appointed as a non-official independent director of Air India in 2017 for three years.

Political career

Entry into politics
Syed Zafar Islam was influenced by Narendra Modi's politics and joined the Bharatiya Janata Party (BJP) on 5 April 2014 after resigning as director of Deutsche Bank, India . He was made the National Spokesperson of the party. In 2017, he was appointed as a non-official independent director of Air India by the Appointments Committee of the Cabinet. A close friend of Jyotiraditya Scindia, Zafar is believed to have help Scindia shift to the BJP from the congress in 2020 and topple the elected Madhya Pradesh Congress government of Kamal Nath. He also writes opinion pieces on politics and economic affairs in several national newspapers.

Member of Parliament
In the 2020 by-polls, he was elected unopposed to the vacant Rajya Sabha seat from Uttar Pradesh.

See also
Bharatiya Janata Party
Arif Mohammad Khan
Mukhtar Abbas Naqvi
Nighat Abbass
Tahir Aslam Gora
Tarek Fatah

References

Bharatiya Janata Party politicians from Uttar Pradesh
Indian Muslims
Rajya Sabha members from Uttar Pradesh
Investment bankers
Living people
People from Hazaribagh district
Year of birth missing (living people)